North Macedonia have qualified once for a UEFA European Championship, the 2020 edition (played in 2021 due to the COVID-19 pandemic). They qualified after winning play-off path D; this meant they would appear in a major tournament finals for the first time in their history. At the tournament, the side competed in Group C, but were eliminated in the first round after losing all three of their matches.

Euro 2020

Group stage

Overall record

References

 
Countries at the UEFA European Championship